John Stainsby (25 September 1937 – 2000) was an English professional footballer who played as a striker in the Football League for Barnsley, York City and Stockport County, in non-League football for Wath Athletic and was on the books of Wolverhampton Wanderers without making a league appearance.

References

1937 births
People from the Metropolitan Borough of Barnsley
2000 deaths
English footballers
Association football forwards
Wolverhampton Wanderers F.C. players
Wath Athletic F.C. players
Barnsley F.C. players
York City F.C. players
Stockport County F.C. players
English Football League players
Sportspeople from Yorkshire